Harold William Corbett (1890 – 3 May 1917) was a pioneer Australian rugby league footballer and soldier who served in World War I and died on the Western Front.

Rugby League
Brought up in Sydney's Eastern Suburbs Corbett attended Waverley Public School. He played for the Eastern Suburbs and Annandale clubs of the New South Wales Rugby Football League premiership. Corbett was in the Easts' squad during their first and second premiership years of 1911 and 1912. He was the 56th player to play first-grade for Eastern Suburbs.

His father William Francis Corbett (1857–1923) and brother Claude Corbett were both well-known Sydney sporting journalists.

War service
Harold also gave his occupation as "Journalist" when he enlisted in the first AIF in 1915. He embarked from Sydney on board HMAT A21 Marere in August 1915 as a Sergeant in the 19th Battalion of the 5th Brigade (New South Wales). The 19th Battalion had been raised in 1915 and was first sent  to Gallipoli where it fought against the Turks, before being withdrawn from the peninsula and being sent to France in early 1916, where it served in the trenches along the Western Front as part of the Australian Corps.

In 1917, the 19th Battalion was involved in the attack on German forces after their retreat to the Hindenburg Line. Corbett was killed in action on 3 May 1917 being the first day of battle of Second Bullecourt. He has no known grave but is commemorated at the Commonwealth Memorial in Villers-Bretonneux.

Bibliography
 Whiticker, Alan & Hudson, Glen (2006) The Encyclopedia of Rugby League Players, Gavin Allen Publishing, Sydney

Online sources
 Harold Corbett at the AIF Project

Footnotes

1892 births
1917 deaths
Annandale rugby league players
Australian Army soldiers
Australian military personnel killed in World War I
Australian rugby league players
Rugby league halfbacks
Date of birth missing
Rugby league players from Sydney
Sydney Roosters players